The 1950 Kentucky Derby was the 76th running of the Kentucky Derby. The race took place on May 6, 1950.

Full results

References

1950
Kentucky Derby
Derby
Kentucky Derby